|}

This is a list of House of Assembly results for the 1918 South Australian state election. Each district elected multiple members.

Every voter would receive a ballot paper where they would cast 2 or 3 votes for different candidates. In electorates that were not unopposed, the 2 or 3 candidates with the most votes would be elected.

Results by electoral district

Adelaide

Albert

Alexandra

Barossa

Burra Burra

East Torrens

Flinders

Murray

Newcastle

North Adelaide

Port Adelaide

Port Pirie

Stanley

Sturt

Victoria

Wallaroo

West Torrens

Wooroora

Yorke Peninsula

See also
 Candidates of the 1918 South Australian state election
 Members of the South Australian House of Assembly, 1918–1921

References
History of South Australian elections 1857-2006, volume 1: ECSA

1918
1918 elections in Australia
1910s in South Australia